Brian Campeau (born 1980) is a Canadian musician, based in Melbourne, Australia.

Early life
Brian Campeau is originally from Ottawa, Canada. He graduated from Guelph University in 1999. He moved to Sydney, Australia in 2002. He now lives in Melbourne, Australia.

Career
Since 2002 Brian Campeau has released 6 studio albums under his name and 4 studio albums with Green Mohair Suits. He's also contributed to the recordings of multiple other artists such as Elana Stone, Melanie Horsnell, Passenger, All Our Exes Live in Texas, Hinterlandt and Clio Renner amongst many others.

His song 'Montreal' was chosen as the main song for NAB's 'More Give, Less Take' advertisement campaign.

Discography

Brian Campeau
 Brian Campeau and the Solitary Game (Independent – 2004)
 Two Faces (Vitamin music – 2007 to 2009)
 Mostly Winter Sometimes Spring (Inertia Music – 2009)
 Don't overthink it, overthink, overthinking (Art As Catharsis – 2015)
 Old Dog, New Tricks (Small Pond/Art As Catharsis - 2018)
 Ambient Driver (Art As Catharsis - 2020)

Green Mohair Suits
 Sing Songs from the Heathen Hymnbook (Independent – 2009)
 Green – The Green Album" (Independent – 2012)
 Wooden Duck (Independent - 2014)
 Evans St (independent - 2016)

References

 Primate Perspective review of Brian Campeau gig supporting Katie Noonan at the Opera House, Sydney
 Throwshapes Blog – Interview with Brian Campeau

External links
 

1980 births
Living people
21st-century Canadian guitarists